George Cummins may refer to:

 George Cummins (priest) (died 1872), Archdeacon of Trinidad
 George Cummins (footballer) (1931–2009), Irish footballer
 George Cummins (United Irishmen) (1770–1830), member of the Society of the United Irishmen
 George Baker Cummins (1904–2007), American mycologist
 George David Cummins (1822–1876), American Anglican bishop

See also
 George Cummings (born 1938), American guitarist and songwriter
 George Cummings (footballer) (1913–1987), Scottish footballer
 George Cummings (cricketer) (1882–1943), New Zealand cricketer